The 2008–09 Stephen F. Austin Lumberjacks basketball team represented Stephen F. Austin University during the 2008–09 NCAA Division I men's basketball season. The Lumberjacks were led by head coach Danny Kaspar and played their home games at the William R. Johnson Coliseum. They were members of the Southland Conference. The Lumberjacks finished the season 24–8, 13–3 in Southland play to claim the Southland regular season championship. They were champions of the Southland Conference tournament to earn an automatic bid to the NCAA tournament – the first appearance in school history. As No. 14 seed in the South region, they lost in the Round of 64 to No. 3 seed Syracuse.

Roster

Schedule and results

|-
!colspan=9 style=| Non-Conference Regular season

|-
!colspan=9 style=| Southland Regular season

|-
!colspan=9 style=| Southland tournament

|-
!colspan=9 style=| NCAA tournament

Awards and honors
Matt Kingsley – Southland Player of the Year

References

Stephen F. Austin Lumberjacks basketball seasons
Stephen F. Austin
Stephen F. Austin
Stephen F. Austin Lumberjacks basketball
Stephen F. Austin Lumberjacks basketball